Memories, Dreams, Reflections is a partially autobiographical book by Swiss psychologist Carl Jung and an associate, Aniela Jaffé. First published in German in 1962, an English translation appeared in 1963.

Background
In 1956 Kurt Wolff, publisher and owner of Pantheon Books, expressed a desire to publish a biography of Jung's life. Dr. Jolande Jacobi, an associate of Jung, suggested that Aniela Jaffé be the biographer.

At first, Jung was reluctant to cooperate with Jaffé, but, because of his growing conviction of the work's importance, he became engrossed in the project and began writing some of the text himself. Jung wrote the first three chapters (about his childhood and early adulthood). In the introduction to the book Aniela Jaffé noted: “One morning he informed me that he wanted to set down his recollections of his childhood directly. By this time he had already told me a good many of his earliest memories, but there were still great gaps in the story. This decision was as gratifying as it was unexpected, for I knew how great a strain writing was for Jung. At his advanced age he would not undertake anything of the sort unless he felt it was a “task” imposed on him from within.” Some time afterwards she noted down a remark of Jung’s:

Jung also contributed part of the chapter titled "Travels" (the part about his travels to Kenya and Uganda), and the chapter titled "Late Thoughts." The rest of the text was written by Jaffé in collaboration with Jung.

The content and layout of the book was much disputed. Jung's family, in the interest of keeping Jung's private life from the public eye, pushed for deletions and other changes. The publisher demanded that the text be greatly shortened to keep the price of printing down. Jaffé was accused of practicing censorship when she began to exercise her Jung-appointed authority to reword some of his thoughts on Christianity, which she deemed to be too controversial.

Eventually, the disputed text (including a chapter entitled "Encounters" detailing some of Jung's friendships and acquaintanceships) was integrated into other chapters. Pantheon Books dropped its demand for further deletions after protests from Jaffé and others.

The book was finally published in English by Pantheon Books, a division of Random House, in 1963, two years after Jung's death. It has remained in print ever since.

Summary
Memories, Dreams, Reflections details Jung's childhood, his personal life, and his exploration of the psyche.

Reception
Historian Peter Gay comments in his Freud: A Life for Our Time (1988) that Memories, Dreams, Reflections is well-titled, given that it emphasizes dreams. Gay comments that, "Like many autobiographies, it is more revealing than the author meant it to be."

References

1962 books
Books published posthumously
Collaborative books
Pantheon Books books
Works by Carl Jung